Kiwira River is a river located in  Rungwe District and Kyela District of Mbeya Region, Tanzania.

Course
It rises in the Poroto Mountains southeast of Mbeya and receives several streams originating on the slopes of Mount Rungwe, including the Marogala, Sinini, Kipoke, Kilasi and Mulagala. Kijungu Falls is on the upper course of the river. It then flows southeast and empties into the northern end of Lake Malawi near the town of Kyela. The lower course flows through the Kyela Plain, which sits northwest of Lake Malawi in the valley of the East African Rift. The Kyela Plain is cultivated intensively with rice and other crops.

Daraja la Mungu
It can be viewed from a man-made bridge crossing the river 500 m upstream.

References

Rivers of Tanzania
Geography of Mbeya Region